Teymuraz Besikovich Gabashvili (born 23 May 1985) is a Russian professional tennis player. He has a career-high singles ranking of World No. 43 achieved on 1 February 2016. He has reached the fourth round of the 2010 and 2015 French Open. On 18 November 2021, Gabashvili was banned from competition for 20 months after testing positive for furosemide.

Tennis career

2001–2002: Juniors
As a junior Gabashvili posted a singles win–loss record of 38–34 (47–29 in doubles) and reached as high as no. 33 in the junior world singles rankings (and no. 40 in doubles) in January 2002.

Junior Slam results:

Australian Open: 3R (2002)
French Open: 1R (2001, 2002)
Wimbledon: 1R (2002)
US Open: 2R (2001)

2003–2006: ATP debut
Gabashvili made his ATP tour debut in 2004 in Båstad, where he lost to Olivier Patience of France.

2007–2009
At Wimbledon, Gabashvili faced Roger Federer in the first round and lost.

In the first round of the 2007 US Open, Gabashvili defeated World No. 7 Fernando González in five sets. In the fourth set, Gabashvili served for the match at 5–4, but hit three consecutive double faults. He lost the game and the set, but came back in the fifth and final set to win the match.

2008 proved to be unimpressive for Gabashvili as he lost in the first round of his first four tournaments before breaking his right wrist, effectively ending his season.

In the first round of the 2009 US Open, he lost in straight sets to American Jesse Levine.

2010: French Open fourth round
In the third round of the 2010 French Open, he beat Andy Roddick in straight sets. However, he was beaten in the fourth round by Austria's Jürgen Melzer in four sets.

At the 2010 US Open, Gabashvili played World No. 1 Rafael Nadal in the first round, and lost.

2011
Gabashvili represented his country at the 2011 Summer Universiade held in Shenzhen and won a silver medal. Despite being ranked below the top 100 in the ATP rankings, Gabashvili was still by far the highest-ranked player in the singles draw, and was thus a favorite to win Gold. He advanced all the way to the singles final without dropping a set before suffering a surprising defeat at the hands of Lim Yong-Kyu, a member of South Korea's Davis Cup team.

2012–2016: Second French Open fourth round, Top 50 debut and career-high ranking
At the 2015 French Open, Gabashvili repeated his 2010's result and advanced to the fourth round without losing a set, defeating in order, 10th seed Feliciano López, Juan Mónaco and Lukáš Rosol. In the fourth round, he lost in straight sets to 5th seed Kei Nishikori.

At the 2015 Citi Open, Gabashvili upset two time Grand Slam champion and world No. 3 Andy Murray in the second round in three tight sets to claim only his fourth ever win against a Top 10 player, however he lost to Ričardas Berankis in the next round in two sets.

He finished the year 2015 ranked World No. 50 for the first time in his career. On 1 February 2016, he achieved his highest career singles ranking of World No. 43.

2021: 20 months ban from competition
In November 2021, he was banned for 20 months from competing for doping. He was ranked No. 270 on 15 November 2021.

Personal life
Gabashvili speaks Russian, Georgian, Spanish and English. He has a daughter Nicole.

In July 2010, Gabashvili changed the spelling of his given name with the ATP World Tour from Teimuraz to Teymuraz.

On 18 November 2021, Gabashvili was banned from competition for 20 months after testing positive for furosemide.

ATP career finals

Doubles: 2 (1 title, 1 runner-up)

Challenger and Futures finals

Singles: 28 (15–13)

Doubles: 20 (13–7)

Career performance timeline

Singles

Doubles

Wins over top 10 players

National participation

Davis Cup (6–6)

   indicates the outcome of the Davis Cup match followed by the score, date, place of event, the zonal classification and its phase, and the court surface.

ATP Cup (2–1)

Notes

References

External links

 
 
 
 Gabashvili world ranking history

1985 births
Living people
Sportspeople from Tbilisi
Russian male tennis players
Russian sportspeople of Georgian descent
Tennis players from Moscow
Tennis players at the 2016 Summer Olympics
Olympic tennis players of Russia
Universiade medalists in tennis
Universiade silver medalists for Russia
Medalists at the 2011 Summer Universiade
Doping cases in tennis